Friendly Hall, built in 1893, is a three-story, red-brick masonry building located on the University of Oregon campus in Eugene, Oregon, United States.

Description
Friendly Hall overlooks the old campus quad, which dates to the founding of the university in 1876 and which includes some of the oldest and most historically significant buildings on campus, including Deady Hall (1876), Villard Hall (1886) and Fenton Hall (1906). The building was named for Samson Friendly, a Eugene merchant, Eugene city mayor (1893–95) and a member of the Union University Association, which established the university.

History
The building was designed in a Jacobean style by the renowned Portland architectural firm Whidden & Lewis, who devised many of the most significant buildings in Portland, including Portland City Hall.  Completed in 1893, the building was intended to be co-ed housing for the students at the school with separate entrances for men in the north and women in the south, and a communal dining area in the center. This idea only lasted for one year before it was converted to a fully male dormitory.   The building continued to be used in this fashion until 1928, when Straub Hall opened as the new dorm and it was then converted into office space. The building was renovated in 1914, 1920, 1933, 1957, and 1961, when 27 new rooms were added.   It is currently used as offices for the Department of Romance Languages.

See also
University of Oregon campus
List of University of Oregon buildings

References

University of Oregon buildings
Buildings and structures in Eugene, Oregon
1893 establishments in Oregon